Paxiúba may refer to:

Geography
 Paxiúba River, a tributary of the Aripuanã River in Mato Grosso, Brazil

Plants
 Socratea exorrhiza
 Iriartea